The Vorya is a river in Moscow Oblast, Russia. It is a left tributary of the Klyazma.

Major tributaries: left — Pazha, Torgosha and Pruzhonka, Zhmuchka; right — Talitsa, Lyuboseyevka and Lashutka.

References 

Rivers of Moscow Oblast